Hagley Park Academy was originally founded as Hagley Park County Secondary Modern in 1955 and was located in Rugeley, Staffordshire. Later it was rebuilt and changed its name to Hagley Park Sports College, becoming Hagley Park Academy between 2011 and 2015. This was a mixed secondary school which was part of the Creative Education Trust, along with Fair Oak Academy and Rugeley Sixth Form Academy.

In November 2015 the Creative Education Trust launched a consultation on the possibility of merging its academies in Rugeley. The plans foresaw the new school operating over two sites, with pupils in academic years 7, 8 and 9 housed at the Fair Oak Academy site as a lower school and years 10, 11, 12 and 13 housed at the Hagley Park Academy site as an upper school. The merger commenced in September 2016, and The Hart School opened in its place, using the Hagley Park site to house 'Upper School' years (10, 11, 12 and 13).

From January 2021 to March 2022, during the Covid-19 pandemic, former Hagley Park Academy facilities were used as a free walk-in Covid-19 testing site.

References

External links
School Web Site

Defunct schools in Staffordshire
Rugeley
Educational institutions disestablished in 2016
2016 disestablishments in England